Rabindra University, Bangladesh is a government-funded public university in Bangladesh, first established in 2017.

Located in Shahjadpur (শাহজাদপুর), Khukni Road, Rabindra kachari bari (রবীন্দ্র কাছারি বাড়ি).

List of vice-chancellors
 Bishwajit Ghosh (June 2017– June 2021)
 Md. Shah Azam (June 2021 – present)

Academics
The university's 5 departments are organised into 4 faculties.

References

External links
 University Grants Commission of Bangladesh
 Bangladesh Bureau of Educational Information and Statistics
 Rabindra University, Bangladesh

Sirajganj District
Public engineering universities of Bangladesh
Memorials to Rabindranath Tagore